The Hyundai Intrado is a mini SUV concept car made by Korean company Hyundai. It is powered by a hydrogen fuel cell powertrain with a 36-kWH Lithium-ion battery.

See also
Hyundai Tucson (ix35) FCEV
Hyundai Nexo

References

Hydrogen cars
Fuel cell vehicles
Intrado